Harvinder Kumar Sahani also known as Romi Sahni is an Indian politician and a member of the 16th and Seventeenth Legislative Assembly of Uttar Pradesh in India. He represents the Palia constituency of Uttar Pradesh and was a member of the Bahujan Samaj Party till 2016, when he joined the Bhartiya Janata Party.

Early life and education
Harvindar  Kumar Sahani was born in Lakhimpur Kheri district. He attended the Chhatrapati Shahu Ji Maharaj University and attained Bachelor's degree.

Political career
Harvindar Kumar Sahani has been a MLA since he represented the Palia constituency 
in 2012 as a member of the Bahujan Samaj Party.

In Sep. 2016 Sahani left the Bahujan Samaj Party and joined Bhartiya Janata Party. In Seventeenth Legislative Assembly of Uttar Pradesh 2017 he again represented the Palia constituency as a member of Bhartiya Janata Party defeating INC candidate Saif Ali Naqvi by a record margin of 69,228 votes.

Posts held

See also

 Palia (Assembly constituency)
 Sixteenth Legislative Assembly of Uttar Pradesh
 Uttar Pradesh Legislative Assembly

References 

Bahujan Samaj Party politicians from Uttar Pradesh
Uttar Pradesh MLAs 2012–2017
Chhatrapati Shahu Ji Maharaj University alumni
People from Lakhimpur Kheri district
1965 births
Living people
Uttar Pradesh MLAs 2022–2027